Meiacanthus fraseri is a species of combtooth blenny found in the western Indian Ocean, around Cargados Carajos.  This species grows to a length of  SL. Its specific name honours Thomas H. Fraser of the Mote Marine Laboratory who collected the type.

References

fraseri
Fish described in 1976
Endemic fauna of Mauritius